Square Butte is an unincorporated community in Chouteau County, Montana, United States, named for the unique rock formation of the same name slightly southwest of the town.

The Square Butte Jail, Square Butte School, and West Quincy Granite Quarry, all of which are listed on the National Register of Historic Places, are located in Square Butte.

Demographics

References

Unincorporated communities in Chouteau County, Montana
Unincorporated communities in Montana